Sir Charles Arthur Hillas Lempriere Abbott (31 October 1889 – 14 September 1960) was an Australian politician who represented the South Australian House of Assembly seats of East Torrens from 1933 to 1938 and Burnside from 1938 to 1946 for the Liberal and Country League.

He was appointed as a judge of the Supreme Court of South Australia in 1946 and continued in that role until 1959.

He was knighted in January 1960.

References

 

1889 births
1960 deaths
Members of the South Australian House of Assembly
Liberal and Country League politicians
20th-century Australian politicians
Attorneys-General of South Australia
Australian Knights Bachelor
Judges of the Supreme Court of South Australia
20th-century Australian judges